Hossein Tala is an Iranian conservative politician who was formerly a member of the Parliament of Iran representing Tehran, Rey, Shemiranat and Eslamshahr.

References

1969 births
Living people
Members of the 9th Islamic Consultative Assembly
Deputies of Tehran, Rey, Shemiranat and Eslamshahr
Front of Islamic Revolution Stability politicians